Compsilura is a genus of tachinid flies in the family Tachinidae from Mozambique, Malawi and South Africa.

Species
C. concinnata (Meigen, 1824)
C. samoaensis Malloch, 1935
C. solitaria (Curran, 1940)
C. sumatrensis Townsend, 1926

References

Exoristinae
Tachinidae genera
Taxa named by Peter Friedrich Bouché
Diptera of Africa
Diptera of Asia
Diptera of Europe
Diptera of South America